This is a list of Czech Academy Award winners and nominees. This list details the performances of Czech actors, actresses, and films that have either been submitted or nominated for, or have won, an Academy Award.

Best International Feature Film

This list focuses on essentially Czech films and directors and producers of other non-English language films, including submissions from the Czech Socialist Republic prior to the dissolution of Czechoslovakia.

Best Supporting Actress

Best Director

Best Juvenile Acting

Best Screenwriting

Best Production Design

Best Cinematography

Best Costume Design

Best Makeup and Hairstyling

Best Animated Short Film

Best Documentary Feature

Best Original Score

Best Original Song

Best Sound

Best Visual Effects

Nominations and Winners

See also

 Cinema of the Czech Republic
 List of Czech films considered the best

References

Lists of Academy Award winners and nominees by nationality or region
Academy Awards
Academy Awards